William Hughes Mulligan (March 5, 1918 – May 13, 1996) was a United States circuit judge of the United States Court of Appeals for the Second Circuit.

Education and career

Born on March 5, 1918, in New York City, New York, Mulligan received an Artium Baccalaureus degree in 1939 from Fordham University and a Juris Doctor in 1942 from Fordham University School of Law. He served in the United States Army as a special agent for the Counterintelligence Corps from 1942 to 1946. He served on the faculty of Fordham University School of Law in a number of capacities from 1946 to 1971, specifically as a lecturer from 1946 to 1952, as an associate professor from 1953 to 1954, as assistant dean and professor of law from 1954 to 1956, as dean from 1956 to 1971 and as the Wilkinson Professor of Law from 1961 to 1971.

Federal judicial service

Mulligan was nominated by President Richard Nixon on April 26, 1971, to a seat on the United States Court of Appeals for the Second Circuit vacated by Judge J. Edward Lumbard. He was confirmed by the United States Senate on May 20, 1971, and received his commission on May 27, 1971. He served as a board member of the Federal Judicial Center from 1979 to 1981. His service terminated on March 31, 1981, due to his resignation. In resigning, he stated that the salary for federal appellate judges was too low to provide for his family. He once stated that while he could possibly live on a judge's salary, he could not afford to die on it.

Post judicial service and death

After his resignation from the federal bench, he engaged in the private practice of law with the law firm of Skadden, Arps, Slate, Meagher & Flom in New York City from 1981 to 1991. He retired in 1991 after suffering a stroke. He died in Bronxville, New York on May 13, 1996.

Other service and publication

In addition to his legal career, Mulligan was a successful public speaker delivering acclaimed humorous and serious remarks to a variety of organizations from bar associations to Irish-American civic groups. A collection of Mulligan's after-dinner speeches was edited and posthumously published with an introduction by Mulligan's son, William Hughes Mulligan, Jr., under the title Mulligan's Law: The Wit and Wisdom of William Hughes Mulligan (Fordham University Press 1997).

Honor

A summer intramural moot court competition at Fordham Law, for rising second-year students, is named for Mulligan. Students who do well receive invitations to join the Fordham Moot Court Board.

References

Sources 
 

1918 births
1996 deaths
20th-century American judges
Fordham University School of Law alumni
Judges of the United States Court of Appeals for the Second Circuit
Deans of law schools in the United States
Skadden, Arps, Slate, Meagher & Flom people
United States court of appeals judges appointed by Richard Nixon
Lawyers from New York City
Fordham University faculty